Bulac or BULAC may refer to:

 Bibliothèque universitaire des langues et civilisations (BULAC), an oriental academic library in France
 Bulac River, a river in Romania